An overmodelled skull is a skull covered with various materials to reconstruct the appearance of a human head. This technique of art and religion is described in many countries throughout the ages.

Origins 
A custom that has existed since the Neolithic era, it is widespread in Oceania and the Near East. It originated as a cult of ancestors and consists of covering the dry skull with a plastic material, such as earth, clay, ash, plaster or lime. Skulls can be embellished with pigments, jewellery etc. Sometimes, skulls of animals are also over-modelled.

Gallery

References

Articles annexes 
 Skull
 Papua New Guinean art
 Plastered human skulls

Bibliography 
 Alain Nicolas, Art papou, Nouvelles Éditions Scala, Paris, 2000 & L'art papou : Austronésiens et Papous de Nouvelle-Guinée (catalogue d'exposition, Musée de Marseille, 2000.
 Maxime Rovere, Magali Melandri, Rouge kwoma : peintures mythiques de Nouvelle-Guinée : exposition, Paris, Musée du quai Branly, 14 octobre 2008-4 janvier 2009, Réunion des musées nationaux : Musée du quai Branly, Paris, 2009, .
 
 Anthony JP Meyer, Oceanic Art, Könemann, 1995.
 Arthur C. Aufderheide, Overmodeled Skulls, Heide Press, 2009

Papua New Guinean culture
Art by country
 
Indigenous art